There are around 171 villages in Sangamner tehsil of Ahmednagar district of state of Maharashtra. Following is the list of village in Sangamner tehsil.

A
 Akalapur
 Ambhore
 Ambidumala
 Ambikhalsa
 Amlewadi
 Ashvi Bk
 Ashvi Kd
 Aurangpur

B
 Bhojdari
 Birewadi
 Borban
 Bota

C
 Chandanapuri
 Chanegoan
 Chikani
 Chikhali
 Chincholi Gurav
 Chinchpur Kd

D
 Darewadi
 Dawas
 Devgoan
 Devkavthe 
 Dhad Khurd
 Dhandarphal Bk
 Dhandarphal Kd
 Digras
 Dolasne
 Devpur

G
 Ghargon
 Ghulewadi
 Gunjalwadi
 Ganeshwadi

J
 Jakhori
 Jambhul Wadi
 Jambut Bk
 Jawale Baleshwar
 Jawale Kadlag
 Jorvee

K
 Kanjapur
 Kankapur
 Kanoli
 Karjulepathar
 Karule
 Kasaradumala
 Kasare
 Khali
 Khambe
 Khandarmalwadi
 Khandgoan
 Kharadi
 Khare
 Kharshinde
 Kokangoan
 Kolhewadi
 Kolwade
 Konchi
 Khed
 Kothe Bk
 Kauthe Dhandarphal
 Kauthe Kamleshwar
 Kothe Kd
 Kouthe Malkapur
 Kuran
 Kurkundi
 Kurkutwadi
 Karule
 Kakadwadi

L
 Lohare

M

 Manchi
 Mahalwadi
 Maldad
 Malegoan Haveli
 Malegoan Pathar
 Malewadi
 Malunje
 Mandve Bk
 Manglapur
 Manoli
 Mendhawan
 Mhaswandi
 Mirpur
 Mirzapur

N
 Nanduri Dumala
 Nandurkhandrmal
 Nilwande
 Nimaj
 Nimble
 Nimgoan Bhojapur
 Nimgoan Bk
 Nimgoan Kd
 Nimgaon Tembhi
 Nimgoanjali
 Nimon
 Nannaj Dumala

O
 Ozer BK
 Ozer Kd

P
 Palaskhede
 Panodi 
 Paregaon Bk
 Paregoan Kd
 Pemgiri
 Pimpalgaon konzira
 Pimpalgaon Matha
 Pimpalgoan Depa
 Pimpalgaon Khand
 Pimparne
 Pimple
 Pimpri louki Azampur
 Pokhari Baleshwar
 Pokhari Haveli
 Pratappur

R
 Rahimpur(Mal)
 Rahimpur(Khale Gaon)
 Rajapur
 Rankhambwadi
 Rayate
 Rayatewadi

S
 Sadatpur
 Sakur
 Samnapur
 Sangamner Kd
 Sangvi
 Sarole Pathar
 Sawarchol
 Sawargoan Ghule
 Sawargoan Tal
 Saykhindi
 Shedgoan
 Shiblapur
 Shindodi
 Shirapur
 Shirasgoan Dhupe
 Shindewadi
 Sukewadi

T
 Talegoan
 Tisgoan
 Tigoan

U
 Umbri Balapur

V
 Velhale
 Vadzari

W
 Wadgoan Landga
 Wadgoanpan
 Wadzari Bk
 Wadzari Kd
 Waghapur
 Wankute
 Warudi Pathar
 Warvandi
 Wadzari Bk
 Wadgavpan

Z
 Zarekati
 Zole

See also
 Sangamner tehsil
 Tehsils in Ahmednagar
 Villages in Akole tehsil
 Villages in Jamkhed tehsil
 Villages in Karjat tehsil
 Villages in Kopargaon tehsil
 Villages in Nagar tehsil
 Villages in Nevasa tehsil
 Villages in Parner tehsil
 Villages in Pathardi tehsil
 Villages in Rahata tehsil
 Villages in Rahuri tehsil
 Villages in Shevgaon tehsil
 Villages in Shrigonda tehsil
 Villages in Shrirampur tehsil

References

 
Sangamner